is a Buddhist temple belonging to the Rinzai school (Myōshin-ji branch) of Japanese Zen, located in the city of Suwa, Nagano, Japan. Its main image is a statue of Shaka Nyōrai. The temple is located a 15 minute walk from Kami-Suwa Station.

History
Onsen-ji was founded in 1640 AD as the bodaiji of the Suwa clan, daimyō of Takashima Domain; however, as all temple records were lost when the temple burned down in 1870. The current Sanmon was formerly a gate of Takashima Castle and was relocated to this site after that castle was demolished following the Meiji restoration. Likewise, the entry to the Hondō makes use of materials from the Noh stage formerly at Takashima Castle. The Kyōzō, built in 1780, is one of the few structures of the temple to have escaped the 1870 fire. The bell at Onsen-ji dates from the Muromachi period and is a Nagano Prefectural Important Cultural Property.

Takashima Domain Suwa clan cemetery
The  is located at Onsen-ji. The cemetery contains the graves of the second through the eighth generations of daimyō of Takashima Domain, together with the graves of their wives, consorts, and many of their children, for over 100 graves in total. The graves of the daimyō  all have a similar gravestone, but only that of Suwa Tadatsune, the second daimyō has a wooden chapel. The cemetery was designated a National Historic Site of Japan in 2018.

See also
List of Historic Sites of Japan (Nagano)

References

External links
Nagano History database 

Buddhist temples in Nagano Prefecture
Suwa, Nagano
Myoshin-ji temples
1640 establishments in Japan
Shinano Province
Suwa clan
History of Nagano Prefecture
Historic Sites of Japan
Mausoleums in Japan